The 1931 Wellington City mayoral election was part of the New Zealand local elections held that same year. In 1931, elections were held for the Mayor of Wellington plus other local government positions including fifteen city councillors. The polling was conducted using the standard first-past-the-post electoral method.

Background
Mayor George Troup declined to stand for a third term. Councillor Thomas Hislop was selected as his replacement to stand for the Civic League. The Labour Party did not stand a mayoral candidate, the first time they had not done so since 1917. An election was necessitated when the deputy mayor Martin Luckie accepted the request of a deputation of citizens to run for mayor.

Mayoralty results

Councillor results

References

Mayoral elections in Wellington
1931 elections in New Zealand
Politics of the Wellington Region
1930s in Wellington